The Rivals is a 1664 comedy play by the English writer William Davenant. It is a reworking of The Two Noble Kinsmen by William Shakespeare and John Fletcher.

It was first acted by the Duke's Company at the Lincoln's Inn Fields Theatre in London. The original cast included Henry Harris as Theocles, Thomas Betterton as Philander, Cave Underhill as Cunopes the Jailor, John Young as Arcon, William Smith as Polynices, Samuel Sandford as Provost, Anne Shadwell as Heraclia and Jane Long as Leucippe.

It was a success running for nine straight nights and being revived on several occasions.

References

Bibliography
 Collins, Howard S. The Comedy of Sir William Davenant. Walter de Gruyter, 2015.
 Van Lennep, W. The London Stage, 1660-1800: Volume One, 1660-1700. Southern Illinois University Press, 1960.

1664 plays
West End plays
Restoration comedy
Plays by William Davenant
Plays and musicals based on works by William Shakespeare
Works based on The Canterbury Tales
Plays based on works by Geoffrey Chaucer